This is a list of banks in Mexico, including chartered banks, credit unions, trusts, and other financial services companies that offer banking services and may be popularly referred to as "banks".

Central bank
Bank of Mexico

Mexican banks
ABC Capital
Accendo Banco
Actinver
Banca Mifel
Banco Autofin
Banco Amigo
Banca Afirme
Bancrea
Banco Multiva
Bansi S.A.
BanCoppel
Banco Famsa
Banco Finterra
Banco Forjadores
Banco Monex
Banco Azteca
BanBajío
Inbursa
Intercam
Banco Inmobiliario Mexicano
Banco Invex
Banco Ve X +
Bankaool
Banorte
BanRegio
Compartamos Banco
Consubanco
CI Banco
Banco BASE
Agrofinanzas
Fundación Dondé Banco
Pagatodo

Foreign-owned banks
American Express Bank
Bank of America
Bank of China
BBVA México, founded as Banco de Comercio (Bank of Commerce) or Bancomer, in 2000 Spanish bank BBVA was the majority shareholder until 2004 when it purchased all shares and wholly owned it.
Citibanamex, founded as Banco Nacional de México (National Bank of Mexico) or Banamex, it was purchased by Citigroup in August 2001.
Banco Volkswagen México
Banco Sabadell
Barclays Mexico
Credit Suisse
Deutsche Bank
HSBC México
Industrial and Commercial Bank of China
J. P. Morgan Chase
KEB Hana
Mizuho Bank Mexico
MUFG
Santander México, formerly Banco Santander Serfin.
Scotiabank, The Bank of Nova Scotia purchased Mexico's Grupo Financiero Inverlat in 1992.
Shinhan Bank
UBS Bank

Public banks
Banco del Bienestar, previously known as Bansefi until 2019 when its banking offerings were expanded

Development banks
 Bancomext, SNC (Export - import bank)
 Banjercito, SNC (Army)
 Banobras, SNC (Subnational and project finance)
 Financiera Rural (Agriculture)
 Nafinsa, SNC
 SHF, SNC (Mortgage)

Defunct banks
 Banca Confia (failed); acquired by Citibank and now absorbed into Banamex
 Banca Cremi (bought and became Banco Unión)
 Banca Promex (begin as Banco de Zamora)
 Banca Serfin (merged with Banco Santander Mexicano); absorbed into Banco Santander Serfin
 Banco Bilbao Vizcaya (bought Bancomer)
 Banco Central Mexicano (failed, early 20th century)
 Banco de Londres, México y Sudamerica (first Mexican bank), later Banca Serfin)
 Banco Facil (merged with Sociedad Financiera de Objeto Limitado (Sofol) to form Consubanco)
 Banco de Oriente (bought by BBVA)
 Banco del Atlántico (bought by BITAL, BITAL was later taken over by HSBC)
 Banco del Centro (BANCEN) or (BANCENTRO) (bought by Banorte)
 Banco del Sureste
 Banco Hipotecario
 Banco Internacional (bought by Prime and became BITAL)
 Banco Interacciones (bought by Banorte)
 Banco Longoria
 Banco Mexicano Somex (bought by Invermexico and became Banco Mexicano)
 Banco Mexicano (bought by Banco Santander and became Banco Santander Mexicano; now part of Banco Santander (Mexico))
 Banco Mercantil Mexicano (merged with Banco Nacional Mexicano to form Banco Nacional de México, 1884)
 Banco Nacional Mexicano (merged with Banco Mercantil Mexicano to form Banco Nacional de México, 1884)
 Banco Sofimex
 Banco Unión (failed and bought by Banorte)
 Banco Wal-Mart de México Adelante (sold to Inbursa)
 Bancreser (later Bancrecer)
 Banpaís (bought by Asemex)
 Banpeco (bought by BNCI)
 Banoro
 Banrural
 BBVA Probursa (merged with Bancomer and became BBVA Bancomer)
 Banco BCH (bought by Banco Unión)
 BITAL (taken over by HSBC)
 Crédito Méxicano
 Deutsche Bank Mexico (Sold Mexican unit to InvestaBank S.A.)
 ING Mexico (went bankrupt)
 IXE Banco (merged with Banorte)
 Grupo Bursatil Mexicano (bought by Banco del Atlántico)
 Multibanco Comermex (bought by Inverlat and became Comermex Inverlat) Scotiabank Inverlat
 Multibanco Mercantil de México
 Multibanco Mercantil Probursa (later BBVA Probursa)
 Prudential Bank (taken over by Actinver S. A.)
 Sociedad Financiera de Objeto Limitado (Sofol) (merged with Banco Facil to form Consubanco)

References

 Lists
Mexico
Banking in Mexico
banks
Mexico